Get Your Heart On – The Second Coming! is an EP by Canadian rock band Simple Plan, composed primarily of b-sides from Get Your Heart On!. It was released on 29 November 2013 in Australia and on 3 December 2013 worldwide except for Japan, which was released 29 January 2014.

Track listing

Charts

Album

Charted songs

Personnel
 Pierre Bouvier – lead vocals
 Sebastien Lefebvre – rhythm guitar, background vocals
 David Desrosiers – bass, background vocals
 Jeff Stinco – lead guitar
 Chuck Comeau – drums

References

External links

Get Your Heart On – The Second Coming! at YouTube (streamed copy where licensed)

2013 EPs
Atlantic Records EPs
Simple Plan albums